Docking protein 1 is a protein that in humans is encoded by the DOK1 gene.

Function 

Docking protein 1 is constitutively tyrosine phosphorylated in hematopoietic progenitors isolated from chronic myelogenous leukemia (CML) patients in the chronic phase.  It may be a critical substrate for p210(bcr/abl), a chimeric protein whose presence is associated with CML.  Docking protein 1 contains a putative pleckstrin homology domain at the amino terminus and ten PXXP SH3 recognition motifs.  Docking protein 2 binds p120 (RasGAP) from CML cells.  It has been postulated to play a role in mitogenic signaling.

Interactions 

DOK1 has been shown to interact with:

 ABL1 and 
 CD117, 
 INPP5D, 
 LYN, 
 RASA1, 
 RET, 
 SH2D1A, 
 SHC1,  and
 TEC.

References

Further reading